Markku Aro (born Markku Tuomas Puputti on 3 February 1950 in Mouhijärvi, Finland), is a Finnish singer who represented Finland in the Eurovision Song Contest 1971 in Ireland with the pop-duo . They appeared with the song "Tie uuteen päivään" ("Road to a New Day"). He has released many albums in his country and was awarded with the Iskelmä-Finlandia prize for schlager music in 2017.

Discography

Albums 
 Markku Aro (1969)
 Oo - mikä nainen (1972)
 Niin käy kun rakastuu (1973)
 Oma kultasein (1974)
 Katso luontoa ja huomaa (1975)
 Etsin kunnes löydän sun (1976)
 Markku Aro (1977)
 Anna aikaa (1978)
 Daniela (1979)
 Mun suothan tulla vierees sun (1981)
 Suojassa saman auringon (1982)
 Markku Aro (1985)
 Kaksi rakkainta (1990)
 Rakastamme vain toisiamme (1991)
 Käsi kädessä (1993)
 Rakkauden toukokuu (1997)
 Menneisyyden sillat (1999)
 Sinetti (2001)
 Kestän mitä vaan (2006)
 Tilaisuus on nyt (2008)
 Anna katse (2010)
 Anna tulta (2013)

Compilations 
 Parhaat päältä (1978)
 Markku Aron parhaat (1979)
 Parhaat (1989)
 Markku Aro (1990)
 20 suosikkia – Etsin kunnes löydän sun (1995)
 Markku Aro (1995)
 20 suosikkia – Rakastamme vain toisiamme (1997)
 20 suosikkia – Anna mun ajoissa tietää (2001)
 Kaikki parhaat 1968-2001 (2CD) (2001)
 Suomihuiput (2003)
 Hitit (2004
 Tähtisarja - 30 suosikkia (2CD) (2006)
 Käyn uudelleen eiliseen – 50 vuoden klassikot (2018)

References

External links 
 Official page of Markku Aro in Finnish

1950 births
Living people
People from Sastamala
20th-century Finnish male singers
Eurovision Song Contest entrants for Finland
Eurovision Song Contest entrants of 1971